Abdulla Salem, born 18 March 1983 in Dubai, United Arab Emirates, is a professional football player. He currently plays has previously played for the United Arab Emirates national football team. He is a defender.

Career

References

External links 
 Abdulla Salem website
 Abdulla Salem's Statistics by UAE Arabian Gulf League
 
 

United Arab Emirates international footballers
Association football defenders
2004 AFC Asian Cup players
Emirati footballers
Living people
1983 births
Dubai CSC players
Al Ahli Club (Dubai) players
Al Wahda FC players
Sharjah FC players
Al-Ittihad Kalba SC players
Al Urooba Club players
UAE First Division League players
UAE Pro League players